Kahtey Hain Mujhko Raja is a 1975 Bollywood film directed and produced by Biswajeet. The film stars Biswajeet, Rekha in lead roles, along with Dharmendra, Hema Malini, Shatrughan Sinha in supporting roles. The music was composed by R. D. Burman.

Cast
Biswajeet as Raja Thakur / Rajaram "Raja" (Double Role)
Dharmendra as Balram
Hema Malini as Courtesan 
Rekha as Reena
Shatrughan Sinha as ASP Shankar
Alka as Radha Thakur
Bipin Gupta as Thakur
Nadira as Thakurain  
Abhi Bhattacharya as Randhir Thakur

Soundtrack
Lyrics: Majrooh Sultanpuri

External links
 

1975 films
1970s Hindi-language films
Films scored by R. D. Burman